This is a list of lighthouses in Japan.

Lighthouses

See also
 Lists of lighthouses and lightvessels
 List of tallest structures in Japan
 Fifty lighthouses in Japan — Lighthouses poll by Japan Coast Guard (in Japanese)

References

External links

 
 Japan Coast Guard

Japan
Lighthouse
Lighthouses
Lighthouses